Wildhaus-Alt St. Johann is a municipality in the Wahlkreis (constituency) of Toggenburg in the canton of St. Gallen in Switzerland.  It was formed on 1 January 2010 through the merger of Alt St. Johann and Wildhaus.

Demographics

Historic population
The historical population is given in the following table:

Weather
Wildhaus has an average of 157 days of rain or snow per year and on average receives  of precipitation. During this month there is precipitation for an average of 14.7 days. The month with the most days of precipitation is June, with an average of 15.8, but with only  of rain or snow.

Heritage sites of national significance
The paleolithic cave, Wildenmannlisloch in Alt St. Johann and the birthplace of the Reformer Huldrych Zwingli at Lisighus 167 in Wildhaus are listed as Swiss heritage sites of national significance.

References

External links

 OAlt St. Johann official website 
 Wildhaus website 
 

Municipalities of the canton of St. Gallen
Ski areas and resorts in Switzerland
Cultural property of national significance in the canton of St. Gallen
Toggenburg
Populated places established in 2010